

Xeon (UP/DP), Dual Core

"Allendale" (65 nm) 
 Based on Core microarchitecture
 All models support: MMX, SSE, SSE2, SSE3, SSSE3, Intel 64, XD bit (an NX bit implementation), Intel VT-x
 All models support uni-processor configurations
 Die size: 111 mm²
 Steppings: L2

"Conroe" (65 nm) 
 Based on Core microarchitecture
 All models support: MMX, SSE, SSE2, SSE3, SSSE3, Intel 64, XD bit (an NX bit implementation), Intel VT-x
 All models support uni-processor configurations
 Die size: 143 mm²
 Steppings: B2, G0

"Woodcrest" (65 nm) 
 Based on Core microarchitecture
 All models support: MMX, SSE, SSE2, SSE3, SSSE3, Intel 64, EIST, XD bit (an NX bit implementation), Intel VT-x
 All models support dual-processor configurations
 Die size: 143 mm²
 Steppings: B2, G0
 For processors with G0 stepping Vmin = 0.85 V

"Wolfdale-CL" (45 nm) 
 Based on Penryn microarchitecture
 All models support: MMX, SSE, SSE2, SSE3, SSSE3, SSE4.1, Enhanced Intel SpeedStep Technology (EIST), Intel 64, XD bit (an NX bit implementation), Intel VT-x
 Models support only uni-processor configurations
 Die size: 107 mm²
 Steppings: C0, E0

"Wolfdale" (45 nm) 
 Based on Penryn microarchitecture
 All models support: MMX, SSE, SSE2, SSE3, SSSE3, SSE4.1, Intel 64, XD bit (an NX bit implementation), Intel VT-x
 All model support EIST
 All models support only single-processor configurations
 Die size: 107 mm²
 Steppings: C0, E0

"Wolfdale-DP" (45 nm) 
 Based on Penryn microarchitecture
 All models support: MMX, SSE, SSE2, SSE3, SSSE3, SSE4.1, Intel 64, XD bit (an NX bit implementation), Intel VT-x
 All model support EIST except L5238, L5240.
 E5205, L5238, L5240, X5260, X5270, X5272 support Demand-Based Switching.
 All models support dual-processor configurations
 Die size: 107 mm²
 Steppings: C0, E0

Xeon (UP/DP), Quad Core

"Kentsfield" (65 nm) 
 Based on Core microarchitecture
 All models support: MMX, SSE, SSE2, SSE3, SSSE3, Enhanced Intel SpeedStep Technology (EIST), Intel 64, XD bit (an NX bit implementation), Intel VT-x
 All models support uni-processor configurations
 Die size: 2× 143 mm²
 Steppings: B3, G0

"Yorkfield-6M" (45 nm) 
 Based on Penryn microarchitecture
 All models support: MMX, SSE, SSE2, SSE3, SSSE3, SSE4.1, Enhanced Intel SpeedStep Technology (EIST), Enhanced Halt State (C1E), Intel 64, XD bit (an NX bit implementation), Intel VT-x
 All models support uni-processor configurations
 Die size: M1: 2× 107 mm², R0: 2× 81 mm²
 Steppings: M1, R0

"Yorkfield" (45 nm) 
 Based on Penryn microarchitecture
 All models support: MMX, SSE, SSE2, SSE3, SSSE3, SSE4.1, Enhanced Intel SpeedStep Technology (EIST), Enhanced Halt State (C1E), Intel 64, XD bit (an NX bit implementation), Intel VT-x
 All models support uni-processor configurations
 Die size: 2× 107 mm²
 Steppings: C1, E0

"Yorkfield-CL" (45 nm) 
 Based on Penryn microarchitecture
 All models support: MMX, SSE, SSE2, SSE3, SSSE3, SSE4.1, Enhanced Intel SpeedStep Technology (EIST), Enhanced Halt State (C1E), Intel 64, XD bit (an NX bit implementation), Intel VT-x
 All models support uni-processor configurations
 Die size: 2× 107 mm²
 Steppings: C1, E0

"Clovertown" (65 nm) 
 Based on Core microarchitecture
 All models support: MMX, SSE, SSE2, SSE3, SSSE3, Intel 64, XD bit (an NX bit implementation), Intel VT-x
 EIST support all except E5310, E5335.
 Intel Demand-Based Switching support E5320, E5345, L5318, X5355, X5365.
 All models support dual-processor configurations
 Steppings: B3, G0
 Die size: 2× 143 mm²

E5330, E5340 and E5350 is not listed on but it is mentioned on.  In August 2007, E5330 is widely available. In June 2007, E5340 Engineering Samples were available on eBay.

"Harpertown" (45 nm) 
 Based on Penryn microarchitecture
 All models support: MMX, SSE, SSE2, SSE3, SSSE3, SSE4.1, Intel 64, XD bit (an NX bit implementation), Intel VT-x, Demand-Based Switching except E5405, L5408; EIST except E5405
 All models support dual-processor configurations
 Die size: 2× 107 mm²
 Steppings: C0, E0

Xeon MP, Multi Core

"Tigerton" (65 nm) 
 Based on Core microarchitecture
 All models support: MMX, SSE, SSE2, SSE3, SSSE3, Enhanced Intel SpeedStep Technology (EIST), Intel 64, XD bit (an NX bit implementation), Intel VT-x
 All models support quad-processor configurations
 Die size: 2× 143 mm²
 Steppings: G0

"Dunnington" (45 nm) 
 Based on Penryn microarchitecture
 All models support: MMX, SSE, SSE2, SSE3, SSSE3, SSE4.1, Demand-Based Switching, Intel 64, XD bit (an NX bit implementation), Intel VT-x
 E7440, E7450, X7460 support EIST.
 All models support quad-processor configurations
 Transistors: 1.9 billion
 Die size: 503 mm²
 Steppings: A1

References 

Intel Xeon (Core)